Olearia macdonnellensis is a species of flowering plant in the family Asteraceae and is endemic to a restricted part of the Northern Territory of Australia. It is an erect, bushy shrub shrub with broadly elliptic to broadly egg-shaped leaves and yellow, or white and yellow, daisy-like inflorescences.

Description
Flowering occurs from May to October and the fruit is a hairy achene, the pappus with 20 to 32 bristles.

Taxonomy
Olearia macdonnellensis was first formally described in 1986 by David Alan Cooke in the journal Muelleria from specimens collected by Peter Latz in 1983 near the "Ellery Creek Big Hole".

Distribution and habitat
This daisy bush grows in low woodland on rocky scree slopes or gullies and is restricted to the western part of the MacDonnell Ranges in the south of the Northern Territory.

Conservation status
Olearia macdonnellensis is listed as "vulnerable" under the Australian Government Environment Protection and Biodiversity Conservation Act 1999 and as "endangered" under the Northern Territory Government Territory Parks and Wildlife Conservation Act 1976. The main threats to the species are inappropriate fire regimes and weed invasion.

References

macdonnellensis
Flora of the Northern Territory
Plants described in 1986